Leylek is a district of Batken Region in south-western Kyrgyzstan. It borders with Batken District in the east, and Tajikistan in the south, west, and north. The administrative seat lies at Razzaqov.

Geography 

Leylek District is located between the northern slopes of the Turkestan Range and the Ferghana Valley. It contains the lowest point of Kyrgyzstan: 401 meters above sea level.

Population

Towns, rural communities and villages
In total, Leylek District includes 1 town and 47 villages in 1 town and 9 rural communities. The rural communities and settlements in the Leylek District are:

 town of district significance Razzaqov (including 6 villages: Golbo, Samat, Chimgen, Taylan, Myrza-Patcha and Ak-Bulak)
 Ak-Suu (seat: Ak-Suu; and also villages Alga, Jengish, Suu-Bashy and Jezken)
 Beshkent (seat: Beshkent; incl. Karl Marks, Kayragach, SSSRdin 50 jyldygy and Eski-Oochu)
 Jangy-Jer (seat: Tsentralnoye; incl. Arka and Dostuk)
 Katrang (seat: Katrang; incl. Jangy-Turmush and Özgörüsh)
 Kulundu (seat: Kulundu; incl. Bulak-Bashy, Internatsional'noye, Kommunizm, Lenin and Maksat)
 Leylek (seat: Korgon; incl. Kara-Suu, Leylek, Chuyanchy and Ak-Terek)
 Margun (seat: Margun; incl. Churbek, Darkhum and Dargaz)
 Sumbula (seat: Andarak; incl. Iskra, Kök-Tash and Kommuna)
 Toguz-Bulak (seat: Toguz-Bulak; and also villages Ay-Kol, Kara-Bulak, Madaniyat, Kyrgyzstandyn 50 jyldygy and Chapaev)

Note: Sülüktü is a town of regional significance of Batken Region, and is not part of the Leylek District.

References 

Districts of Batken Region